Live in Hamburg is the fifth live album by German rock band Böhse Onkelz. It was recorded on 5 October 2004 at the Color Line Arena in Hamburg. The concert was the last concert of the tournament "La Ultima".

Track listing

CD 1
 Intro
 Hier sind die Onkelz
 Lieber stehend sterben
 Finde die Wahrheit
 Ich bin in dir
 Buch der Erinnerung
 Danket dem Herrn
 Ja, Ja
 Onkelz vs. Jesus
 Wieder mal 'nen Tag verschenkt
 Terpentin
 Nichts ist für die Ewigkeit
 Firma
 Danke für nichts
 Superstar

CD 2
 Nur die Besten sterben jung
 Nie wieder
 Immer auf der Suche
 Stunde des Siegers
 So sind wir
 Für immer (Version 2004)
 Heilige Lieder
 Gehasst, verdammt, vergöttert
 Erinnerungen
 Feuer
 Auf gute Freunde
 Kirche
 Mexico
 Ihr hättet es wissen müssen
 A.D.I.O.Z.

End-of-year charts

References

Böhse Onkelz live albums
Albums recorded at Color Line Arena
2005 live albums
German-language live albums